Pirkko Helena Saisio (born 16 April 1949) is a Finnish author, actress and director. She has also written under the pen names Jukka Larsson and Eva Wein. Saisio has a broad literary output, dealing with many kinds of texts from film screenplays all the way to librettos for the ballet. Her novel Betoniyö (1981) was adapted into a feature film Concrete Night in 2013 by Pirjo Honkasalo.

Saisio received her degree in acting from Suomen teatterikoulu (now Theatre Academy) in 1975 and worked there as a professor of dramaturgy in 1997 and 2001. In 1975 she won the J. H. Erkko Award for her debut novel Elämänmeno.

Saisio's daughter, whose father is the late Harri Hyttinen, is actress Elsa Saisio. Pirkko Saisio lives in a same-sex partnership with film director Pirjo Honkasalo.

References

External links 
Pirkko Saisio by WSOY
 

1949 births
Living people
Finnish LGBT novelists
Finnish stage actresses
Finnish women novelists
Lesbian novelists
Finnish lesbian actresses
Finnish lesbian writers
Finlandia Prize winners